Dharmasraya, is the capital of the 11th century Buddhist polity known as Melayu Kingdom, based on the Batanghari river system in modern-day  West Sumatra and Jambi, on the island of Sumatra, Indonesia. The kingdom itself could be identified by the name of its capital Dharmasraya or by the name Bhumi Malayu or Suvarnnabhumi according to Padang Roco Inscription.

Formation
After the invasion by Rajendra Chola I the king of the Chola Empire from Koromandel, authority of Sailendra dynasty over the islands of Sumatera and the Malay Peninsula weakened. Some time later came a new dynasty that took over the role of Sailendra Dynasty, called by the name of Mauli dynasty. The Dharmasraya can be considered as the successor of Srivijaya.

The oldest inscription bearing the name of Maharaja Mauli is the Grahi inscription dated 1183 discovered in Chaiya (Grahi) Malay Peninsula, Southern Thailand. The inscription bears the order of  Maharaja Srimat Trailokyaraja Maulibhusana Warmadewa to the bhupati (regent) of Grahi named Mahasenapati Galanai to make a statue of Buddha weight 1 bhara 2 tula with the value of 10 gold tamlin. The artist name that responsible to create the statue is Mraten Sri Nano.

The second inscription from Mauli dynasty appear approximately a hundred years later in 1286. The inscription in which the name Dharmasraya and the name of king is Srimat Tribhuwanaraja Mauli Warmadewa appears dates from the 13th century, namely the Padang Roco inscription discovered around the headwaters of Batanghari river (now Dharmasraya Regency in West Sumatera), dated 1286.

List of rulers
The Maharajas of Dharmasraya:

See also

 History of Indonesia
 Melayu Kingdom
 Srivijaya
 Malay

References

 
11th century in Indonesia
Former monarchies of East Asia